Sahib Biwi Gulam is an Indian television series aired on Sahara One channel. The series is based on the 1953 Bengali novel Saheb Bibi Golam by Bimal Mitra.  The series starred Raveena Tandon. The series was shot in Kolkata, West Bengal, and was directed by Rituparno Ghosh.

Cast
 Raveena Tandon as Chhoti Bahu
 Ayub Khan as Chote Babu
 Arjun Chakraborty as Majhle Babu
 Roopa Ganguly as Majhli Bahu 
 Mouli Ganguly as Jaba
 Rajesh Shringarpure as Bhootnath
 Benjamin Gilani as Subinay Babu
 Zeb Khan as Nannhe Babu
 Kabir Sadanand as Nanni Gopal
 Aparna Bhatnagar as Chunnidasi
 Vaquar Shaikh as Natu Dutt
 Masood Akhtap as Bansi
 Neha Amandeep

References

Sahara One original programming
Indian television soap operas
Indian drama television series
Television shows based on Indian novels
2004 Indian television series debuts
2004 Indian television series endings
Television shows set in West Bengal